Hope Sabanpan-Yu is a short story writer/poet from Cebu City, Philippines. She earned her doctorate degree in Comparative Literature from the University of the Philippines Diliman and her Master of Arts in English from the University of Calgary (Canada).

Hope is current Director of the Cebuano Studies Center of the University of San Carlos. She also serves as the Central Visayas coordinator of the National Committee on Literary Arts (NCLA). She is the secretary of the Women Studies Association of the Philippines (WSAP). A member of the Women in Literary Arts (WILA) and Bathalan-ong Halad sa Dagang (Bathalad), Hope writes both in Cebuano and in English. Her poetry has been published in several collections: Paglaum (2000), Ang Tingog ni Maria (2001), Beads (2002) and Mga Dad-onon sa Biyahe (2004). She edited two anthologies of interviews with Cebuano writers, Kapulongan: Conversations with Cebuano Writers (2008), and Kulokabildo: Dialogues with Cebuano Writers (2009) published by the USC Cebuano Studies Center. She co-edited  Small wonder: a collection of essays (2010)  published by USC Press. She edited the late Cornelio Faigao's collection of poetry Canto Voice (2013) and also co-edited Brown Child: The Best of Faigao Poetry and Fiction (2013) with Erlinda Alburo, published by USC Press.

Hope has also translated several authors of Cebuano fiction. Mila's Mother (2008), published by the National Commission for Culture and the Arts, is a translation of Austregelina Espina-Moore's serialized novel entitled Ang Inahan ni Mila. Men at Sea and other stories (2009), also published by the NCCA, is a translation of Gremer Chan Reyes's short story collection Binuhat sa lawod ug uban pang mga sugilanon. Crack Shot and other Stories (2010), a translation of the short story collection of Ernesto D. Lariosa's Hingigo ug uban pang mga sugilanon was published by the USC Press together with Where the fire tree grows (2010), a novel by Austregelina Espina-Moore. USC Press published two of her translated volumes, Reawakened Bliss (2011, with Haidee Palapar), a collection of Gardeopatra Quijano's short fiction and Hunger in Nayawak and other stories (2012, with Trizer Mansueto), a compilation of Lamberto Ceballos's prize-winning fiction. She edited Temistokles Adlawan's collection Because love is not blind (2012), translated by Merlie Alunan, and likewise translated another Austregelina Espina-Moore novel House of Cards (2013), both of which were published by the National Commission for Culture and the Arts.

In 2007, Hope's doctoral dissertation was given the Best Dissertation award from the University of the Philippines. Subsequently it was published by the University of the Philippines Press as Women's Common Destiny: Maternal Representations in the Serialized Cebuano Fiction of Hilda Montaire and Austregelina Espina-Moore (2009). It was awarded the prestigious Lourdes Lontok-Cruz Award for research excellence last April 30, 2010. Her other scholarly works are Bridging Cultures: The Migrant Philippine Woman in the Works of Jessica Hagedorn, Fatima Lim-Wilson and Sophia Romero (2011), Institutionalizing Motherhood (2011), The Controlling Mother (2014) and The Other(ed) Woman: Critical Essays (2014) published by the National Commission for Culture and the Arts.

References

External links
 https://web.archive.org/web/20110714131650/http://cebuwila.multiply.com/photos/album/11/Books_of_Hope_
 http://english.chass.ncsu.edu/jouvert/v4i3/Hopeyu.htm
 http://www.wsap.org.ph/boardmembers.html
 http://www.seasrepfoundation.org/pdf/2004-2005%20Annual%20Report.pdf
 http://www.philstar.com/Article.aspx?articleid=412080
 http://www.cebuanostudiescenter.com/current-director/

Cebuano writers
Filipino writers
Writers from Cebu
People from Cebu City
Year of birth missing (living people)
Living people
University of the Philippines Diliman alumni
University of Calgary alumni
Academic staff of the University of San Carlos